761 Brendelia is a minor planet orbiting the Sun that was discovered by German astronomer Franz Kaiser on September 8, 1913, and named after Otto Rudolf Martin Brendel.

This is a member of the dynamic Koronis family of asteroids that most likely formed as the result of a collisional breakup of a parent body.

References

External links
 
 

Koronis asteroids
Brendelia
Brendelia
SC-type asteroids (Tholen)
19130908